The California State Fair is the annual state fair for the state of California. The fair is held at Cal Expo in Sacramento, California. The Fair is a 17-day event showcasing California's industries, agriculture, and diversity of people. The CSF features blue-ribbon animal displays, culinary delights and competitions, live music concerts, a carnival, fireworks, and other family fun. In 2018, officials reported daily attendance drew between 20,000 and 60,000 people per day and about $8.5 million of food and beverage expenditures. The fair is policed by the California Exposition and State Fair Police. The Covid-19 pandemic caused losses of around $16 million in revenue and impacted over 800 seasonal workers. Cal Expo is now a temporary Covid-19 testing site, homeless trailer site, and a go-to partner during the state's battle with wildfires.

History 
According to an editorial in the Daily Alta on November 5, 1850, fairs were common on the east coast of the United States. They believed the state had potential. In 1851 the same editorial staff attended the "Exhibit of California Curiosities" and found it to only be a small sample of the resources of California. In 1854, the California State Legislature created the State Agricultural Society and an exhibit of the state's fruits, vegetables, flowers, grain and livestock, was scheduled for the first time. $5000 worth of premiums were offered for the best of the show. The First California State Fair was held, beginning on October 4, 1854. It was held in San Francisco at the Music Hall on Bush Street, close to Montgomery Street, with the stock being shown at Mission Dolores. At this time the fair was held in a different city each year with Sacramento hosting the following year, in 1855. It then moved to San Jose in 1856, Stockton in 1857 and Marysville in 1858. An exhibit hall was built at Sixth and M Streets in Sacramento for the fair to return in both 1859 and 1860 and then finally given official, permanent residence there. Farmers and people from all over the state came to Sacramento after the fair's permanent move to the city. They came to see the farm machinery and all enjoy the fair entertainment as well as compete for cash premiums for best of show. From 1942 to 1947, the fair was discontinued while the expo was used for military purposes in World War II. According to Alex Cosper's piece tracking the State Fair History, California bought land to construct Cal Expo and eventually in 1963 the construction launched with a price of $33 million. In 1968, the State Fair moved to its current location in the center of the City of Sacramento to the California Exposition (known as Cal Expo) at 1600 Exposition Boulevard. In 2001, California's state fair was recognized as the fifth most visited state fair due to an audience that notably exceeded one million people.

It was announced on April 24, 2020 that the fair for 2020 had been cancelled due to the COVID-19 pandemic. It was also cancelled in 1917–18 & 2021.

Features

Magnificent Midway

Ride Operations 

Rides and Games are operated by Butler Amusements. The state fair involved RCS Amusement prior Butler Amusements' first year of providing the rides and games operator at the state fair in 2009. There are at least 50 carnival rides with each major operation being inspected at least once a year by the Occupational Safety and Health Administration.

Monorail 
There is a permanent monorail system at the fairgrounds. The storage facility for the monorail trams is located in the northwest corner of the grounds. There are four different trams (Blue, Green, Orange, and Red) which are only used during the state fair.

In 1968 and 1971, Universal Mobility Inc. (UMI) constructed two minirail systems located in California. In 1968, UMI created a monorail in Cal Expo to allow people to view the many sections of Cal Expo.

Competitions and showcases
The California State fair hosts and displays a number of art competition pieces, including photography, fine art, and a student showcase for the best student projects.

There are also food and drink competitions for cheeses, wine, beer, and canning and baking.

Others are awarded at the California State Fair for livestock. Competition categories include, Junior Livestock, Open Livestock, and Fur and Feathers.

References

External links 

Fairs in California
Annual fairs
Annual events in California
State fairs
Tourist attractions in Sacramento, California
Festivals established in 1854
1854 establishments in California